The Journal of Forensic and Legal Medicine is a peer-reviewed medical journal covering forensic and legal medicine. It was established in 1972 as the Police Surgeon, obtaining its current name in 2007. It is published by Elsevier on behalf of the Faculty of Forensic and Legal Medicine, of which it is the official journal. The editor-in-chief is Jason Payne-James. According to the Journal Citation Reports, the journal has a 2015 impact factor of 0.870.

References

External links

Forensic science journals
Health law journals
Medical law journals
Publications established in 1972
Elsevier academic journals
English-language journals
Academic journals associated with learned and professional societies of the United Kingdom
8 times per year journals